The following is a list of squads for each nation competing at the 2009 World Women's Handball Championship in the People's Republic of China. The tournament began 5 December, and its final was held in Nanjing on 20 December.

Each nation had to submit an initial squad of 28 players, 12 of them became reserves when the final squad of 16 players was announced on 5 December.

Appearances, goals and ages as of 5 December 2009.

Group A

Darly Zoqby de Paula
 Fabiana Diniz
 Jacquelin Anastacio
 Fernanda da Silva
 Scheyla Gris
 Celia da Costa
 Rosaria da Silva
 Flavia da Silva
 Ana Paula Rodrigues
 Aline Rosas
 Regiane Silva
 Maysa Pessoa
 Silvia Helena Pinheiro
 Barbara Arenhart
 Eduarda Amorim
 Adriana do Nascimento Lima

Head coach:

Head coach:

The squad was announced on 19 November 2009. On 22 November 2009 Susanne Kastrup replaced Gitte Aaen in the squad. On 4 December 2009, Christina Krogshede replaced Lærke Møller in the squad due to a cruciate ligament injury.

Head coach: Jan Pytlick

Head coach:

Head coach:

Head coach:

Group B

Head coach:

Head coach:

Head coach:

Head coach:

Head coach:

Head coach:

Group C

Head coach:

Head coach:

Head coach:

Head coach:

Head coach:

Head coach:

Group D

Head coach:

Head coach:

Head coach:

Head coach:

Head coach:

Head coach:

References

External links 
 Team Information - IHF

World Handball Championship squads
2009 in handball
Women's handball